The Big Picture is the sixth solo studio album by Bap Kennedy, released on August 2, 2005 on Loose Records.  It is a mix of country, Americana and Celtic soul with guest vocals by Shane MacGowan and also features a song co-written with Van Morrison. On "Moriarty's Blues", Carolyn Cassady recites from her book, Off the Road.

In a review by Mojo it was given four out of five stars.

Track listing 
All songs and music by Bap Kennedy, except where noted.
 "Rock and Roll Heaven" – 2:46
 "The Truth is Painful" – 4:00
 "Moriarty's Blues" – 3:15
 "Streetwise" – 3:28
 "Too Old for Fairy Tales" – 4:43
 "Milky Way" – (Van Morrison, Bap Kennedy) - 3:49
 "Loverman" – 3:16
 "Fireworks" – 3:06
 "On the MIghty Ocean Alcohol" (vocals by Shane MacGowan – 3:22
 "The Sweet Smell of Success" –  3:09
 "The Beautiful Country" -3:17

Personnel
Bap Kennedy - lead vocals, acoustic and electric guitar
Ed Deane - acoustic, electric and lap steel guitar
James Walbourne - guitar, mandolin
Carwyn Ellis, Rory McFarlane - bass
BJ Cole - pedal steel guitar
Kieran Kiely - piano, accordion, low whistle, organ
Johnny Mac, Martin Hughes - drums
Michele Drees - drums, percussion
Damian Hand - tenor and alto saxophone
Dave Priseman - trumpet, horn
Jake Walker - violin, viola
Alison Limerick, Carlton Webster, Vera Haime - backing vocals

Notes

External links 
 bapkennedy.com - Reviews: The Big Picture
 Loose music: The Big Picture

Bap Kennedy albums
2005 albums